Alexander Peya and Bruno Soares were the defending champions, but lost in the first round to Fabio Fognini and Jürgen Melzer.
Jesse Huta Galung and Stéphane Robert won the tournament, defeating Daniel Nestor and Nenad Zimonjić in the final, 6–3, 6–3.

Seeds

Draw

Draw

Qualifying

Seeds

Qualifiers
  Teymuraz Gabashvili /  Mikhail Kukushkin

Lucky losers

Qualifying draw

References
 Main Draw

Barcelona Open Banco Sabadell - Doubles